希望 (Onyomi: きぼう kibō; Kunyomi: のぞみ nozomi; Pinyin: xīwàng) is a Japanese and Chinese term meaning "hope". It may refer to:
Kibo (ISS module)
Hope (Toshiko Akiyoshi album)
Hope (Toshiko Akiyoshi song)
Nozomi Okuhara (奥原 希望, 1995–), Japanese badminton player
Nozomi Yamamoto (山本 希望, 1988–), Japanese voice actress

See also
Kibo (disambiguation)
Nozomi (disambiguation)